Philippe Loiseau (born 24 November 1957) is a French politician and a member of National Front.

He is a FN regional councillor in the Centre region. In 2009, he was selected to be National Front's candidate in Centre region for the 2010 regional elections.

References

1957 births
Living people
MEPs for Massif-central–Centre 2014–2019
National Rally (France) MEPs
Prefects of Ain